The swimming competition at the 2005 Mediterranean Games was held in the Las Almadrabillas Sports Centre in Almería, Spain from 24–28 June 2005. It was a long course (50 metres) event.

Medallists

Men's events

Women's events

Medal table

References
USA Swimming
swimrankings

Mediterranean Games
Sports at the 2005 Mediterranean Games
2005